"Mind over matter" is a phrase that has been used in several contexts, such as mind-centric spiritual doctrines, parapsychology, and philosophy.

Merriam Webster Dictionary defines mind as "the element or complex of elements in an individual that feels, perceives, thinks, wills, and especially reasons" and mind over matter as able to; "a situation in which someone is able to control a physical condition, problem, etc., by using the mind".

Origin
The phrase "mind over matter" first appeared in 1863 in The Geological Evidence of the Antiquity of Man by Sir Charles Lyell (1797–1875) and was first used to refer to the increasing status and evolutionary growth of the minds of animals and man throughout Earth history. 

Another related saying, "the mind drives the mass", was coined almost two millennia earlier, in 19 B.C. by the poet Virgil in his work Aeneid, book 6, line 727.

Parapsychology
In the field of parapsychology, the phrase has been used to describe paranormal phenomena such as psychokinesis.

Mao Zedong
"Mind over matter" was also Mao Zedong's idea that rural peasants could be "proletarianized" so they could lead the revolution and China could move from feudalism to socialism through New Democracy. According to some, it departs from Leninism in that the revolutionaries are peasants, instead of the urban proletariat.

Controlling pain
The phrase also relates to the ability to control the perception of pain that one may or may not be experiencing.

References

Paranormal terminology
Philosophical phrases
Psychokinesis
Spirituality
1860s neologisms
Quotations from literature
Quotations from philosophy
English phrases